Sound of Melodies is the debut album from Christian band Leeland released in August 2006 on Essential Records.

Track listing

Singles
"Sound of Melodies"
"Yes You Have"
"Tears of the Saints"
"Reaching"

Award nominations
Grammy nomination for "Best Pop/Contemporary Gospel Album" in 2007.
Dove Award nomination for "Rock/Contemporary Recorded Song of the Year" Sound of Melodies, "Worship Song of the Year" Yes You Have, "Rock/Contemporary Album of the Year", and "Praise & Worship Album of the Year".

References

2006 debut albums
Essential Records (Christian) albums
Leeland (band) albums